Ontrouw   is a 1911 Dutch silent drama film directed by Louis Chrispijn Jr.

Cast
Kees Lageman... 	Kolonel Brachart
Caroline van Dommelen	... 	Renée Brachart
Louis Chrispijn Jr.	... 	Luitenant Raoul des Vignes
Jan Buderman		
Jan van Dommelen

External links 
 

1911 films
Dutch silent feature films
Dutch black-and-white films
1911 drama films
Dutch drama films
Silent drama films